Spanish basketball clubs in European and worldwide competitions is a compilation of the results of clubs from Spain's national top-tier level men's professional basketball league, the Liga ACB, in official international competitions.

Appearances in European finals

Appearances in World-wide finals

Historical progression by team
This tables do not include matches for the third place.

Andorra

Askatuak

Barcelona

Baskonia

Bilbao

Breogán

Cáceres

Cajamadrid

Canarias

Círcol Catòlic

Collado Villalba

Espanyol

Estudiantes

Fuenlabrada

Girona

Granada

Gran Canaria

Granollers

Joventut

Kas Vitoria

Inmobanco

León

Lleida

Lucentum Alicante

Málaga

Manresa

Miraflores

Murcia

OAR Ferrol

Ourense

Picadero

Pineda

Real Betis

Real Madrid

Tenerife

Valencia

Valladolid

YMCA España

Basket Zaragoza

CB Zaragoza

See also 
European basketball clubs in European and worldwide competitions:
 Croatia
 Czechoslovakia
 France
 Greece
 Israel
 Italy
 Russia
 Turkey
 USSR
 Yugoslavia

References

External links
 Linguasport

Spain
International competitions